The Poverty Bay Rugby Football Union is the governing body for rugby union within the Gisborne district, in the area surrounding Poverty Bay on the east coast of the North Island of New Zealand. The men's representative team play from Rugby Park, Gisborne, and currently compete in the Heartland Championship.

History
The Poverty Bay Rugby Football Union was established in 1890 by four clubs in the Gisborne area - Gisborne, Turanganui, Poverty Bay and Warerenga-a-Hika, with the union's inaugural first-class match being held against Hawke's Bay the same year. Since then, the union has played against every other existent union in New Zealand as well as an array of overseas touring sides, including but not limited to Australia, England, South Africa and Japan, against whom Poverty Bay drew in 1974. In 1981, Rugby Park was the scene of clashes between pro-tour supporters and anti-tour protesters prior to a match against the touring South African side. Poverty Bay ultimately lost the game by 6 - 24.

Heartland Championship
Poverty Bay won the Third Division of the National Provincial Championship (NPC), in 1987 and 2005, and finished as runners-up in the same division in 1994, 1995 and 1999. Since 2006, Poverty Bay have competed in the Heartland Championship, a competition organised by the New Zealand Rugby Union for New Zealand's amateur unions. Since the introduction of the format in 2006, the team have had great success, winning the Lochore Cup on four occasions - 2006, 2007, 2008 and 2011.

Heartland Championship placings
Poverty Bay's placings in the Heartland Championship are listed below:

Ranfurly Shield
Poverty Bay have never held the Ranfurly Shield, although they have challenged for the Shield on 16 occasions. In 1980, Poverty Bay came close to defeating Auckland, losing a hard-fought encounter 12 - 19.

Poverty Bay in Super Rugby
Poverty Bay along with Wellington, Wairarapa Bush, Wanganui, East Coast, Hawke's Bay, Manawatu and Horowhenua-Kapiti fall within the  catchment. Hosea Gear is the most notable player from the Poverty Bay region to have played for the side.

All Blacks
There have been seven players selected for the All Blacks whilst playing for Poverty Bay. Most notable amongst these players are Ian Kirkpatrick and Richard "Tiny" White. Other players include John Collins, Brian Fitzpatrick, Lawrie Knight, Mike Parkinson and Hika Elliott 
There have also been players such as Rico Gear, Hosea Gear and Charlie Ngatai who became All Blacks having started their careers with Poverty Bay.

References

External links
 Official Website
 Poverty Bay rugby (NZHistory.net.nz)

New Zealand rugby union teams
New Zealand rugby union governing bodies
Sport in the Gisborne District
Sports organizations established in 1890